Alexis Nahuel Soto (born 20 October 1993) is an Argentine professional footballer who plays as a left-back for Argentine Primera División side Defensa y Justicia on loan from Racing Club.

Career

Club
Soto began his career with Primera C team Dock Sud in 2012, he remained there until 2015 when he joined Argentine Primera División side Banfield. He made his league debut for Banfield on 8 November against Olimpo.

International
Soto represented Argentina at the 2016 Summer Olympics in Brazil.

References

External links
 
 
 
 

1993 births
Living people
Sportspeople from Avellaneda
Argentine footballers
Association football defenders
Footballers at the 2016 Summer Olympics
Olympic footballers of Argentina
Primera C Metropolitana players
Argentine Primera División players
Sportivo Dock Sud players
Club Atlético Banfield footballers
Racing Club de Avellaneda footballers
Defensa y Justicia footballers